David Hunter (1802–1886) was a U.S. Army general in the American Civil War.

David Hunter may also refer to:

 David Hunter of Blackness (died 1809), subject of a famous portrait by Sir Henry Raeburn
 David Hunter (Queensland politician) (1858–1927), Queensland politician
 David Hunter (English cricketer) (1860–1927), English cricketer
 David Ferguson Hunter (1891–1965), Scottish recipient of the Victoria Cross
 David Hunter (New South Wales politician) (1905–1981), New South Wales politician
 Dave Hunter (politician) (1912–1985), Canadian politician
 David Peter Lafayette Hunter (1919–2001), British Royal Marines Officer
 David Lee Hunter (1933–2001), American mathematician and educator
 Dave Hunter (born 1958), Canadian ice hockey player
 David Hunter (epidemiologist), Oxford University, former administrator at Harvard T.H. Chan School of Public Health
 David Hunter (New Zealand cricketer) (born 1968), New Zealand cricketer
 David Hunter (American football) (born 1989), American football defensive tackle
 David Hunter (actor), British actor

See also
 Hunter (surname)